Julián Berrendero Martín (born San Agustín del Guadalix, 8 April 1912, died Madrid, 1 August 1995) was a Spanish road racing cyclist. He is most famous for having won the third and fourth editions of the Vuelta a España in 1941 and 1942. He won the 1941 race after having spent 18 months in a Francoist concentration camp. In addition, he won a total of three mountains jerseys at the Vuelta and the Tour de France

“Berrendero was a marked man, a public figure who had supported the Republican cause. As soon as he reached the Spanish border, Franco’s men arrested him and threw him into a concentration camp, where he remained for 18 months. He survived the camps, which were characterized by disease, malnourishment and frequent beatings, but to what physical and mental cost? He was only 27 and should have been at the height of his cycling career.”

Major results 

1935
GP de la Bicicleta Eibarresa
Tour of Galicia
1936
GP Republica (incl. 3 stages)
Tour de France:
 Winner Mountains classification
 11th place overall classification
1937
Tour de France:
 Winner stage 15
15th place overall classification
1938
Tour de France:
29th place overall classification
1941
Circuito de Getxo
Vuelta Ciclista a Navarra
Vuelta a España:
Winner stages 1 and 20
 Winner overall classification
1942
 Spanish National Road Race Championship
 Spanish National Cyclo-Cross Championship
Volta a la Comunitat Valenciana
Vuelta a España:
 Winner overall classification
 Winner Mountains classification
Winner stages 1 and 9B
1943
 Spanish National Road Race Championship
 Volta a Catalunya
 Trofeo Masferrer
1944
 Spanish National Road Race Championship
 Spanish National Cyclo-Cross Championship
Circuito de Getxo
Clasica a los Puertos de Guadarrama
1945
San Antonio de Durango
Vuelta a España:
 2nd place overall classification
 Winner Mountains classification
Winner stages 1 and 17
1946
 Volta a Catalunya
Vuelta a España:
 2nd place overall classification
Winner stages 4, 18B and 20
1947
Clasica a los Puertos de Guadarrama
Vuelta a España:
Winner stage 3
6th place overall classification
1948
Vuelta a España:
Winner stage 1A

References

External links 

The climber and the dictator" by Paul Maunder
"Vuelte Skelter" by Tim Moore

1912 births
1995 deaths
Spanish male cyclists
Vuelta a España winners
Spanish Tour de France stage winners
People from Cuenca del Medio Jarama
Cyclists from the Community of Madrid